Clover is an unincorporated community and census-designated place (CDP) in rural Halifax County, Virginia, United States. The population as of the 2010 census was 438. Clover was an incorporated town from 1895 until 1998, when it reverted to unincorporated status. Clover was the site of a Rosenwald school, built around 1921 or 1922, with a three-teacher facility on a 2-acre campus.

Black Walnut, a historic plantation house and farm located near Clover, was listed on the National Register of Historic Places in 1991.

Geography
Clover is in northeastern Halifax County, north of U.S. Route 360.

It is drained by tributaries of the Roanoke River.

Notable people
J. Steven Griles (b. 1947), former United States Deputy Secretary of the Interior (2001–04) in the George W. Bush administration, coal lobbyist, implicated in the Jack Abramoff scandal
Henrietta Lacks (1920–1951), source of the HeLa cell line, subject of The Immortal Life of Henrietta Lacks (2010) and The Immortal Life of Henrietta Lacks (film) (2017)
Willie Lanier (b. 1945), Pro Football Hall of Fame linebacker for Kansas City Chiefs
Luther Hilton Foster (1888-1949), President of Virginia Normal and Industrial School, now Virginia State University, near Petersburg
Henry E. Garrett (1894-1973), prominent psychologist at Columbia and UVa, and supporter of racial segregation

References

 

Census-designated places in Halifax County, Virginia
Former municipalities in Virginia
Unincorporated communities in Virginia
Census-designated places in Virginia
Populated places disestablished in 1998